Kassowal railway station (Urdu and )is located in Kassowal town, Sahiwal district of Punjab province of the Pakistan.it constructed in 1865.
It is the birth town of famous international researcher of Artificial Intelligence Dr Iqbal Murtza Mughal

See also
 List of railway stations in Pakistan
 Pakistan Railways

References

External links

Railway stations in Sahiwal District
Railway stations on Karachi–Peshawar Line (ML 1)